The aldol reaction is a means of forming carbon–carbon bonds in organic chemistry.
Discovered independently by the Russian chemist (and Romantic composer) Alexander Borodin in 1869 and by the French chemist Charles-Adolphe Wurtz in 1872, the reaction combines two carbonyl compounds (the original experiments used aldehydes) to form a new β-hydroxy carbonyl compound. These products are known as aldols, from the aldehyde + alcohol, a structural motif seen in many of the products. Aldol structural units are found in many important molecules, whether naturally occurring or synthetic.
For example, the aldol reaction has been used in the large-scale production of the commodity chemical pentaerythritol
and the synthesis of the heart disease drug Lipitor (atorvastatin, calcium salt).

The aldol reaction unites two relatively simple molecules into a more complex one. Increased complexity arises because up to two new stereogenic centers (on the α- and β-carbon of the aldol adduct, marked with asterisks in the scheme below) are formed. Modern methodology is capable of not only allowing aldol reactions to proceed in high yield but also controlling both the relative and absolute configuration of these stereocenters. This ability to selectively synthesize a particular stereoisomer is significant because stereoisomers can have distinctive chemical and biological properties.

For example, stereogenic aldol units are especially common in polyketides, a class of molecules found in biological organisms. In nature, polyketides are synthesized by enzymes that effect iterative Claisen condensations. The 1,3-dicarbonyl products of these reactions can then be variously derivatized to produce a wide variety of interesting structures. Often, such derivitization involves the reduction of one of the carbonyl groups, producing the aldol subunit. Some of these structures have potent biological properties: the immunosuppressant FK506, the anti-tumor agent discodermolide, or the antifungal agent amphotericin B, for example. Although the synthesis of many such compounds was once considered nearly impossible, aldol methodology has allowed their efficient synthesis in many cases.

A typical modern aldol addition reaction, shown above, might involve the nucleophilic addition of a ketone enolate to an aldehyde. Once formed, the aldol product can sometimes lose a molecule of water to form an α,β-unsaturated carbonyl compound. This is called aldol condensation. A variety of nucleophiles may be employed in the aldol reaction, including the enols, enolates, and enol ethers of ketones, aldehydes, and many other carbonyl compounds. The electrophilic partner is usually an aldehyde or ketone (many variations, such as the Mannich reaction, exist). When the nucleophile and electrophile are different, the reaction is called a crossed aldol reaction; on the converse, when the nucleophile and electrophile are the same, the reaction is called an aldol dimerization.

Mechanisms
The aldol reaction may proceed by two distinct mechanisms. Carbonyl compounds, such as aldehydes and ketones, can be converted to enols or enol ethers. These species, being nucleophilic at the α-carbon, can attack especially reactive protonated carbonyls such as protonated aldehydes. This is the 'enol mechanism'. Carbonyl compounds, being carbon acids, can also be deprotonated to form enolates, which are much more nucleophilic than enols or enol ethers and can attack electrophiles directly. The usual electrophile is an aldehyde, since ketones are much less reactive. This is the 'enolate mechanism'.

Despite the attractiveness of the aldol manifold, there are several problems that need to be addressed to render the process catalytic and effective. The first problem is a thermodynamic one: most aldol reactions are reversible. Furthermore, the equilibrium is also just barely on the side of the products in the case of simple aldehyde–ketone aldol reactions. If the conditions are particularly harsh (e.g.: NaOMe/MeOH/reflux), condensation may occur, but this can usually be avoided with mild reagents and low temperatures (e.g., LDA (a strong base), THF, −78 °C). Although the aldol addition usually proceeds to near completion under irreversible conditions, the isolated aldol adducts are sensitive to base-induced retro-aldol cleavage to return starting materials. In contrast, retro-aldol condensations are rare, but possible. This is the basis of the catalytic strategy of class I aldolases in nature, as well as numerous small-molecule amine catalysts.

Enol mechanism
When an acid catalyst is used, the initial step in the reaction mechanism involves acid-catalyzed tautomerization of the carbonyl compound to the enol. The acid also serves to activate the carbonyl group of another molecule by protonation, rendering it highly electrophilic. The enol is nucleophilic at the α-carbon, allowing it to attack the protonated carbonyl compound, leading to the aldol after deprotonation. This usually dehydrates to give the unsaturated carbonyl compound. The scheme shows a typical acid-catalyzed self-condensation of an aldehyde.

Acid-catalyzed aldol mechanism

Acid-catalyzed dehydration

Enolate mechanism
If the catalyst is a moderate base such as hydroxide ion or an alkoxide, the aldol reaction occurs via nucleophilic attack by the resonance-stabilized enolate on the carbonyl group of another molecule. The product is the alkoxide salt of the aldol product. The aldol itself is then formed, and it may then undergo dehydration to give the unsaturated carbonyl compound. The scheme shows a simple mechanism for the base-catalyzed aldol reaction of an aldehyde with itself.

Base-catalyzed aldol reaction (shown using −OCH3 as base)

Base-catalyzed dehydration (frequently written incorrectly as a single step, see E1cB elimination reaction)

Although only a catalytic amount of base is required in some cases, the more usual procedure is to use a stoichiometric amount of a strong base such as LDA or NaHMDS. In this case, enolate formation is irreversible, and the aldol product is not formed until the metal alkoxide of the aldol product is protonated in a separate workup step.

Zimmerman–Traxler model
More refined forms of the mechanism are known. In 1957, Howard Zimmerman and Marjorie D. Traxler proposed that some aldol reactions have "six-membered transition states having a chair conformation." This is now known as the Zimmerman–Traxler model. E-enolates give rise to anti products, whereas Z-enolates give rise to syn products. The factors that control selectivity are the preference for placing substituents equatorially in six-membered transition states and the avoidance of syn-pentane interactions, respectively. E and Z refer to the cis-trans stereochemical relationship between the enolate oxygen bearing the positive counterion and the highest priority group on the alpha carbon. In reality, only some metals such as lithium reliably follow the Zimmerman–Traxler model. Thus, in some cases, the stereochemical outcome of the reaction may be unpredictable.

Crossed-aldol reactant control
When a mixture of unsymmetrical ketones are condensed, four products can be anticipated:

Thus, if one wishes to obtain only one of the cross-products, one must control which carbonyl becomes the nucleophilic enol/enolate and which remains in its electrophilic carbonyl form. The simplest control is if only one of the reactants has acidic protons, and only this molecule forms the enolate. For example, the addition of diethyl malonate into benzaldehyde produces only one product:

If one partner is considerably more acidic than the other, the most acidic proton is abstracted by the base and an enolate is formed at that carbonyl while the carbonyl that is less acidic is not affected by the base. This type of control works only if the difference in acidity is large enough and no excess of base is used for the reaction. A typical substrate for this situation is when the deprotonatable position is activated by more than one carbonyl-like group. Common examples include a CH2 group flanked by two carbonyls or nitriles (see for example the Knoevenagel condensation and the first steps of the malonic ester synthesis and acetoacetic ester synthesis).

One common solution is to form the enolate of one partner first, and then add the other partner under kinetic control. Kinetic control means that the forward aldol addition reaction must be significantly faster than the reverse retro-aldol reaction. For this approach to succeed, two other conditions must also be satisfied; it must be possible to quantitatively form the enolate of one partner, and the forward aldol reaction must be significantly faster than the transfer of the enolate from one partner to another. Common kinetic control conditions involve the formation of the enolate of a ketone with LDA at −78 °C, followed by the slow addition of an aldehyde.

Stereoselectivity
The aldol reaction is particularly useful because two new stereogenic centers are generated in one reaction.  The syn/anti convention is commonly used to denote the relative stereochemistry at the α- and β-carbon.

The convention applies when propionate (or higher order) nucleophiles are added to aldehydes. The R group of the ketone and the R group of the aldehyde are aligned in a "zig zag" pattern in the plane of the paper (or screen), and the disposition of the formed stereocenters is deemed syn or anti, depending if they are on the same or opposite sides of the main chain.

Older papers use the erythro/threo nomenclature familiar from saccharide chemistry.

Enolate geometry
There is no significant difference between the level of stereoinduction observed with E and Z enolates. Each alkene geometry leads primarily to one specific relative stereochemistry in the product, E giving anti and Z giving syn:

Metal ion
The enolate metal cation may play a large role in determining the level of stereoselectivity in the aldol reaction. Boron is often used because its bond lengths are significantly shorter than that of metals such as lithium, aluminium, or magnesium.

For example, boron–carbon and boron–oxygen bonds are 1.4–1.5 Å and 1.5–1.6 Å in length, respectively, whereas typical metal-carbon and metal-oxygen bonds are 1.9–2.2 Å and 2.0–2.2 Å in length, respectively. The use of boron rather than a metal "tightens" the transition state and gives greater stereoselectivity in the reaction. Thus the above reaction gives a syn:anti ratio of 80:20 using a lithium enolate compared to 97:3 using a bibutylboron enolate.

Alpha stereocenter on the enolate
The aldol reaction may exhibit "substrate-based stereocontrol", in which existing chirality on either reactant influences the stereochemical outcome of the reaction. This has been extensively studied, and in many cases, one can predict the sense of asymmetric induction, if not the absolute level of diastereoselectivity. If the enolate contains a stereocenter in the alpha position, excellent stereocontrol may be realized.

In the case of an E enolate, the dominant control element is allylic 1,3-strain whereas in the case of a Z enolate, the dominant control element is the avoidance of 1,3-diaxial interactions. The general model is presented below:

For clarity, the stereocenter on the enolate has been epimerized; in reality, the opposite diastereoface of the aldehyde would have been attacked. In both cases, the 1,3-syn diastereomer is favored. There are many examples of this type of stereocontrol:

Alpha stereocenter on the electrophile
When enolates attacks aldehydes with an alpha stereocenter, excellent stereocontrol is also possible. The general observation is that E enolates exhibit Felkin diastereoface selection, while Z enolates exhibit anti-Felkin selectivity. The general model is presented below:

Since Z enolates must react through a transition state that contains either a destabilizing syn-pentane interaction or an anti-Felkin rotamer, Z-enolates exhibit lower levels of diastereoselectivity in this case. Some examples are presented below:

Unified model of stereoinduction
If both the enolate and the aldehyde contain pre-existing chirality, then the outcome of the "double stereodifferentiating" aldol reaction may be predicted using a merged stereochemical model that takes into account the enolate facial bias, enolate geometry, and aldehyde facial bias. Several examples of the application of this model are given below:

Evans' oxazolidinone chemistry
A widely used method is the Evans' acyl oxazolidinone method.Gage J. R.; Evans D. A., Diastereoselective Aldol Condensation Using A Chiral Oxazolidinone Auxiliary: (2S*,3S*)-3-Hydroxy-3-Phenyl-2-Methylpropanoic Acid , Organic Syntheses, Coll. Vol. 8, p.339 (1993); Vol. 68, p.83 (1990). Developed in the late 1970s and 1980s by David A. Evans and coworkers, the method works by temporarily creating a chiral enolate by appending a chiral auxiliary. The pre-existing chirality from the auxiliary is then transferred to the aldol adduct by performing a diastereoselective aldol reaction. Upon subsequent removal of the auxiliary, the desired aldol stereoisomer is revealed.

In the case of the Evans' method, the chiral auxiliary appended is an oxazolidinone, and the resulting carbonyl compound is an imide. A number of oxazolidinones are now readily available in both enantiomeric forms. They are relatively expensive. However, enantiopure oxazolidinones are derived in 2 synthetic steps from comparatively inexpensive amino acids, which means that large-scale syntheses can be made more economical by in-house preparation. This usually involves borohydride mediated reduction of the acid moiety, followed by condensation/cyclisation of the resulting amino alcohol with a simple carbonate ester such as diethylcarbonate.

The acylation of an oxazolidinone is a convenient procedure, and is informally referred to as "loading done". Z-enolates, leading to syn-aldol adducts, can be reliably formed using boron-mediated soft enolization:

Often, a single diastereomer may be obtained by one crystallization of the aldol adduct. However, anti-aldol adducts cannot be obtained reliably with the Evans method. Despite the cost and the limitation to give only syn adducts, the method's superior reliability, ease of use, and versatility render it the method of choice in many situations. Many methods are available for the cleavage of the auxiliary:

Upon construction of the imide, both syn- and anti-selective aldol addition reactions may be performed, allowing the assemblage of three of the four possible stereoarrays: syn selective: and anti selective:

In the syn-selective reactions, both enolization methods give the Z enolate, as expected; however, the stereochemical outcome of the reaction is controlled by the methyl stereocenter, rather than the chirality of the oxazolidinone. The methods described allow the stereoselective assembly of polyketides, a class of natural products that often feature the aldol retron.

Intramolecular reaction

Intramolecular aldol reaction is the condensation reaction of two aldehyde groups or ketone groups in the same molecule. Five- or six-membered , -unsaturated ketone or aldehydes are formed as products. This reaction is an important approach to the formation of carbon-carbon bonds in organic molecules containing ring systems. As an example, under strong basic conditions (e.g. sodium hydroxide), hexane-2,5-dione (compound A in Figure 1) can cyclize via intramolecular aldol reaction to form the 3-methylcyclopent-2-en-1-one (compound B).

The mechanism of the intramolecular aldol reaction involves formation of a key enolate intermediate followed by an intramolecular nucleophilic addition process. First, hydroxide abstracts the α-hydrogen on a terminal carbon to form the enolate. Next, a nucleophilic attack of the enolate on the other keto group forms a new carbon-carbon bond (red) between carbons 2 and 6. At last, usually under heating conditions, the elimination of water molecule yields the cyclized α,β-unsaturated ketone.

Intramolecular aldol reactions have been widely used in total syntheses of various natural products, especially alkaloids and steroids. An example is the application of an intramolecular aldol reaction in the ring closure step for total synthesis of (+)-Wortmannin by Shigehisa, et al. (Figure 2).

Variations and methods
Acetate aldol reactions
A key limitation to the chiral auxiliary approach described previously is the failure of N-acetyl imides to react selectively. An early approach was to use a temporary thioether group:In this reaction the nucleophile is a boron enolate derived from reaction with dibutylboron triflate (nBu2BOTf), the base is N,N-diisopropylethylamine. The thioether is removed in step 2 by Raney Nickel / hydrogen reduction

Mukaiyama aldol reaction

The Mukaiyama aldol reaction is the nucleophilic addition of silyl enol ethers to aldehydes catalyzed by a Lewis acid such as boron trifluoride (as boron trifluoride etherate) or titanium tetrachloride.3-Hydroxy-3-Methyl-1-Phenyl-1-Butanone by Crossed Aldol Reaction Teruaki Mukaiyama and Koichi Narasaka Organic Syntheses, Coll. Vol. 8, p.323 (1993); Vol. 65, p.6 (1987) The Mukaiyama aldol reaction does not follow the Zimmerman-Traxler model. Carreira has described particularly useful asymmetric methodology with silyl ketene acetals, noteworthy for its high levels of enantioselectivity and wide substrate scope.

The method works on unbranched aliphatic aldehydes, which are often poor electrophiles for catalytic, asymmetric processes. This may be due to poor electronic and steric differentiation between their enantiofaces.

The analogous vinylogous Mukaiyama aldol process can also be rendered catalytic and asymmetric. The example shown below works efficiently for aromatic (but not aliphatic) aldehydes and the mechanism is believed to involve a chiral, metal-bound dienolate.

Crimmins thiazolidinethione aldol
In the Crimmins thiazolidinethione''' approach
a thiazolidinethione performs acetate aldol reactions. and can produce the "Evans syn" or "non-Evans syn" adducts by simply varying the amount of (−)-sparteine. The reaction is believed to proceed via six-membered, titanium-bound transition states, analogous to the proposed transition states for the Evans auxiliary. NOTE: the structure of sparteine shown below is missing a N atom.

Organocatalysis
Chiral secondary amine catalysts catalyze some aldol reactions. These secondary amines form transient enamines when exposed to ketones, which may react enantioselectively with suitable aldehyde electrophiles. The amine reacts with the carbonyl to form an enamine, the enamine acts as an enol-like nucleophile, and then the amine is released from the product all—the amine itself is a catalyst. This enamine catalysis method is a type of organocatalysis, since the catalyst is entirely based on a small organic molecule. In a seminal example, proline efficiently catalyzed the cyclization of a triketone:

This reaction is known as the Hajos-Parrish reaction (also known as the Hajos-Parrish-Eder-Sauer-Wiechert reaction, referring to a contemporaneous report from Schering of the reaction under harsher conditions). Under the Hajos-Parrish conditions only a catalytic amount of proline is necessary (3 mol%). There is no danger of an achiral background reaction because the transient enamine intermediates are much more nucleophilic than their parent ketone enols. This strategy offers a simple way of generating enantioselectivity in reactions without using transition metals, which have the possible disadvantages of being toxic or expensive.

Proline-catalyzed aldol reactions do not show any non-linear effects (the enantioselectivity of the products is directly proportional to the enantiopurity of the catalyst). Combined with isotopic labelling evidence and computational studies, the proposed reaction mechanism for proline-catalyzed aldol reactions is as follows:

This strategy allows the otherwise challenging cross-aldol reaction between two aldehydes. In general, cross-aldol reactions between aldehydes are typically challenging because they can polymerize easily or react unselectively to give a statistical mixture of products. The first example is shown below:

In contrast to the preference for syn adducts typically observed in enolate-based aldol additions, these organocatalyzed aldol additions are anti-selective. In many cases, the organocatalytic conditions are mild enough to avoid polymerization. However, selectivity requires the slow syringe-pump controlled addition of the desired electrophilic partner because both reacting partners typically have enolizable protons. If one aldehyde has no enolizable protons or alpha- or beta-branching, additional control can be achieved.

An elegant demonstration of the power of asymmetric organocatalytic aldol reactions was disclosed by MacMillan and coworkers in 2004 in their synthesis of differentially protected carbohydrates. While traditional synthetic methods accomplish the synthesis of hexoses using variations of iterative protection-deprotection strategies, requiring 8–14 steps, organocatalysis can access many of the same substrates using an efficient two-step protocol involving the proline-catalyzed dimerization of alpha-oxyaldehydes followed by tandem Mukaiyama aldol cyclization.

The aldol dimerization of alpha-oxyaldehydes requires that the aldol adduct, itself an aldehyde, be inert to further aldol reactions.
Earlier studies revealed that aldehydes bearing alpha-alkyloxy or alpha-silyloxy substituents were suitable for this reaction, while aldehydes bearing Electron-withdrawing groups such as acetoxy were unreactive. The protected erythrose product could then be converted to four possible sugars via Mukaiyama aldol addition followed by lactol formation. This requires appropriate diastereocontrol in the Mukaiyama aldol addition and the product silyloxycarbenium ion to preferentially cyclize, rather than undergo further aldol reaction. In the end, glucose, mannose, and allose were synthesized:

"Direct" aldol additions
In the usual aldol addition, a carbonyl compound is deprotonated to form the enolate. The enolate is added to an aldehyde or ketone, which forms an alkoxide, which is then protonated on workup. A superior method, in principle, would avoid the requirement for a multistep sequence in favor of a "direct" reaction that could be done in a single process step. One idea is to generate the enolate using a metal catalyst that is released after the aldol addition mechanism. The general problem is that the addition generates an alkoxide, which is much more basic than the starting materials. This product binds tightly to the metal, preventing it from reacting with additional carbonyl reactants.

One approach, demonstrated by Evans, is to silylate the aldol adduct. A silicon reagent such as TMSCl is added in the reaction, which replaces the metal on the alkoxide, allowing turnover of the metal catalyst. Minimizing the number of reaction steps and amount of reactive chemicals used leads to a cost-effective and industrially useful reaction.

Biological aldol reactions
Examples of aldol reactions in biochemistry include the splitting of fructose-1,6-bisphosphate into dihydroxyacetone and glyceraldehyde-3-phosphate in the fourth stage of glycolysis, which is an example of a reverse ("retro") aldol reaction catalyzed by the enzyme aldolase A (also known as fructose-1,6-bisphosphate aldolase).

In the glyoxylate cycle of plants and some prokaryotes, isocitrate lyase produces glyoxylate and succinate from isocitrate.  Following deprotonation of the OH group, isocitrate lyase cleaves isocitrate into the four-carbon succinate and the two-carbon glyoxylate by an aldol cleavage reaction. This cleavage is similar mechanistically to the aldolase A reaction of glycolysis.

See also

 Aldol–Tishchenko reaction
 Baylis–Hillman reaction
 Ivanov reaction
 Reformatsky reaction
 Claisen-Schmidt condensation

References

External links
 Chem 206, 215 Lecture Notes (2003, 2006) by D. A. Evans, A. G. Myers, et al.'', Harvard University (pp. 345, 936)

Addition reactions
Carbon-carbon bond forming reactions